Thomas Drage (born 20 February 1992 in Mosjøen) is a Norwegian football player who plays for Fredrikstad FK.

Drage's breakout season came in 2011. He led his team in assists, contributing 11 of them, placing him as runner-up behind Strømsgodset's Øyvind Storflor (at 12) on the list of most assists in the league. Drage was also named Tromsø's player of the year. The award, Årets Isbjørn (Polar Bear of the Year), is handed out annually by Tromsø's supporters and decided through a fan poll. Drage received 52.2% of the votes. Thanks to his fine play, Drage was rewarded with a salary increase and a new four-year contract with Tromsø at the end of the 2011 season.

He won his first cap for Norway on 18 January 2012 at the 2012 King's Cup. He came on as a substitute against Thailand, replacing Tarik Elyounoussi at half-time. Norway won the match 1–0.

Career statistics

References

External links

1992 births
Living people
People from Vefsn
Norwegian footballers
Norway international footballers
Tromsø IL players
Sogndal Fotball players
Varbergs BoIS players
Falkenbergs FF players
FK Bodø/Glimt players
Fredrikstad FK players
Norwegian Second Division players
Norwegian First Division players
Eliteserien players
Allsvenskan players
Superettan players
Norwegian expatriate footballers
Expatriate footballers in Sweden
Norwegian expatriate sportspeople in Sweden
Association football midfielders
Sportspeople from Nordland